Arhopala ijanensis is a butterfly in the family Lycaenidae. It was described by George Thomas Bethune-Baker in 1897. It is found in the Indomalayan realm (Burma, Thailand, Peninsular Malaya, Mergui, and Langkawi).

References

External links
Arhopala Boisduval, 1832 at Markku Savela's Lepidoptera and Some Other Life Forms. Retrieved June 3, 2017.

Arhopala
Butterflies described in 1897